Kim Ye-jin (born 20 December 1999) is a South Korean short track speed skater. She competed in the 2018 Winter Olympics.

References

1999 births
Living people
Speed skaters from Seoul
South Korean female short track speed skaters
Olympic short track speed skaters of South Korea
Olympic gold medalists for South Korea
Olympic silver medalists for South Korea
Olympic medalists in short track speed skating
Short track speed skaters at the 2018 Winter Olympics
Medalists at the 2018 Winter Olympics
World Short Track Speed Skating Championships medalists
21st-century South Korean women